Sofía García Gaviria (born 18 October 2000) is a Colombian footballer who plays as a defender for Spanish Primera División club Sporting de Huelva and the Colombia women's national team.

Early life
García was born in Medellín. She started playing football at 7 and in a women's club at 10 in Independiente Medellín.

Club career
García played for Formas Íntimas in Colombia. On 14 January 2021, she signed for Spanish club Sporting de Huelva to compete in Primera División.

International career
García represented Colombia at the 2020 South American Under-20 Women's Football Championship. She made her senior debut for Colombia on 9 November 2019.

References

2000 births
Living people
Footballers from Medellín
Colombian women's footballers
Women's association football defenders
Sporting de Huelva players
Colombia women's international footballers
Colombian expatriate women's footballers
Colombian expatriate sportspeople in Spain
Expatriate women's footballers in Spain
21st-century Colombian women